Typhoon Sally, known in the Philippines as Typhoon Aring,  was a powerful tropical cyclone that brought widespread impacts during its week-long trek across the western Pacific in September 1964. Sally first became a tropical cyclone near the Marshall Islands on September 3, organizing into a tropical depression and then a tropical storm later that day. On September 4, Sally intensified into a typhoon and struck southern Guam the next day. Widespread agricultural damage occurred in the island's southern regions, with the banana crop suffering the costliest losses; the damage toll from crops and property exceeded $115,000. Sally continued to intensify on its west-northwestward trek, and reached its peak strength on September 7 over the Philippine Sea.

Sally's winds lessened thereafter as it brushed the northern Philippines, buffeting areas north of Manila with strong winds and heavy rain and causing serious damage. A person drowned from the typhoon's onslaught, while the naval station at San Vicente and the adjoining village sustained an estimated $500,000 in damage. After crossing the South China Sea, Sally made landfall on the South China coast east of Hong Kong on September 10. Due to fears of a repeat of Typhoon Ruby, which struck the region less than a week prior, 10,000 people were evacuated ahead of the storm. However, the overall impacts in Hong Kong were less than forecast. Sally weakened as it moved into inland China and dissipated on September 11. The remnants of Sally moved northeast and contributed to severe flooding around Seoul, South Korea, leaving 211 people dead or missing and 317 people injured, though 206 people remain unaccounted for. Over 36,000 people were left homeless as over 9,000 homes were either destroyed or flooded, resulting in $750,000 in property damage. The floods were the region's most significant in two decades.

Meteorological history 

The origins of Sally can be traced to the interaction of a trough of low pressure with a westward-propagating tropical wave. This led to the development of a vortex over the Marshall Islands on September 2. During this time, Sally took a west-northwest course that would continue for the remainder of its duration. The storm intensified into a typhoon early on September 4.

The Japan Meteorological Agency (JMA) estimated that Sally's central barometric pressure decreased to 895 hPa (mbar; 26.43 inHg). This made Sally the strongest typhoon of the 1964 Pacific typhoon season as measured by both wind speed (tied with Opal) and central pressure. These winds were also among the fastest ever analyzed for a tropical cyclone globally. The JTWC estimated that Sally's one-minute sustained winds decreased during this period, and continued to diminish further as the typhoon tracked across the South China Sea. After moving inland, the system rapidly weakened, degenerating into a tropical storm later on September 10 and losing its identity as a tropical cyclone the following day over South China. The remnants of Sally continued towards South Korea and Japan before they were last noted on September 16 over southern Kamchatka.

Preparations and impact

Guam and the Philippines 
Sally was ultimately stronger and closer to Guam than forecast, crossing over southern Guam as a developing typhoon on September 5 and producing damaging winds. Gale-force winds lasted for eight hours. A maximum 24-hour rainfall total of  accompanied the storm. Over 1,000 people sought refuge at the College of Guam, and others took shelter in other sturdy buildings. Numerous trees were downed and homes were unroofed by the typhoon. Downed trees and other debris blocked roads, rendering them impassable. The island's southern districts sustained the heaviest impacts from Sally; 18 structures in those areas were damaged, with the impacts most evident to their roofs. The majority of the monetary losses caused by Sally on the island was sustained by crops: agricultural damage was estimated at $105,440, with $92,398 sustained by the banana crop. Damage to residential and commercial buildings was estimated at $9,680, resulting in a total damage toll of about $115,000, mostly were to farm crops. Storm surge along Talofofo Bay led to coastal inundation; eight homes suffered roof damage there. Damage was also documented in Agat, Inarajan, Merizo, and Umatac. Power outages occurred in those villages in addition to Talofofo and Santa Rita. Sally's impacts in Guam were negligible outside of the southern regions of the island, and in total there were no casualties.

Sally was one of the strongest to approach the Philippines on record. The west-northwestward trajectory of Sally threatened the northern Philippines, leading to the issuance of warnings for the region by the Philippine Weather Bureau on September 7. Typhoon signal no. 2, signifying winds up to  within 24 hours, was issued for the Batanes Islands. The storm brought strong winds and heavy rains to areas north of Manila, resulting in substantial crop and property damage. The United States Agency for International Development described Sally as having done "considerable damage" in northern Luzon, but could not assess the total number of casualties. The naval station at San Vicente and the adjoining village sustained an estimated $500,000 in damage; one person drowned and two thousand others were left in need of food and clothing.

Hong Kong and Taiwan 
The outer reaches of Sally brought high winds to southern Taiwan but were inconsequential. Following Typhoon Ruby's impacts in Hong Kong earlier in September, 3,400 workers were enlisted to clear the colony's drainage systems in preparation for Sally. While the center of the storm was forecast to miss Hong Kong, Sally's peripheral winds were expected to be comparable to Ruby's. A spokesperson for the Royal Observatory in Hong Kong called Sally "the biggest [typhoon] in living memory" while the storm was centered  to the southeast. The Hong Kong government noted that cranes, fences, scaffolding, and signboards loosened in Ruby's passage became hazardous with Sally's potential impacts. Ships were brought to protected moorings at the harbor in Hong Kong after the issuance of the first tropical cyclone signals for Sally's approach, leaving the harbor devoid of any vessels; two ships evacuated to open sea to ride out the storm there. Businesses closed and bus and ferry service saw suspensions. Some airlines also canceled their fights. Over 10,000 people were evacuated out of vulnerable areas. Radio broadcasts called upon residents to head home and remain home while Sally passed. Riot police were deployed for crowd control as people began to flee Hong Kong's islands for the mainland en masse. The Hong Kong Red Cross started a blood donation drive in downtown Hong Kong, offering free beer and cigarettes to donors. Sixteen first aid centers were also established throughout Hong Kong.

Sally was the fourth typhoon to impact the Hong Kong area in 1964, though its effects were less severe than initially feared. Thirty people were injured in Hong Kong. The outer extents of Sally began affecting the territory before the storm's closest approach, with the outer winds triggering landslides and depositing trees, glass, and other debris on streets. One person sustained a fractured skull after being struck by a falling iron rod. The strongest gust measured in Hong Kong reached  as registered at Tate's Cairn. Gusts reached  at Kai Tak Airport. Other landslides marooned people in their homes and blocked streets. Severe flooding occurred throughout Hong Kong. Cattle and crop industries were impacted by the storm, though the overall damage was minimized by Typhoon Ruby's agricultural impacts less than week prior. A few hundred chickens were killed by Sally. Eight boats were damaged at Ko Lau Wan and Sha Tau Kok; additional locales in Hong Kong also reported damage to fishing craft, leading to the colonial government granting HK$10,031 in repairs.

South Korea 
At least 211 people were killed and 317 people were injured according to local police; another 206 people were unaccounted for. The high death toll was compounded by the storm's passage at night when most people were asleep. The combination of flash floods and landslides in central South Korea destroyed and flooded 9,152 homes, displacing 36,665 people. Bridges, highways, railroads, and rice paddies were seriously damaged. Total property damage amounted to $750,000. Hardest-hit was Gyeonggi Province, where 72 people died and 115 people went missing. There were 26 confirmed fatalities in Gangwon Province. In Seoul, there were at least 70 fatalities. Almost 2,800 houses were destroyed or inundated around the city. Seoul's power and telephone services were also hampered by the storm. Railways between Seoul and eastern South Korea were cut off by landslides and washouts. A village north of Seoul was completely flooded after a river overflowed its banks; all 96 inhabitants of the village were declared missing, though 10 bodies were later recovered. The State Council of South Korea convened in an emergency session on September 14 in response to the floods. Park Chung-hee, the President of South Korea, initiated "emergency relief measures" for those affected by the storms. Food and bedding were provisioned by the Korean government through an assistance program for affected areas. Chung-hee also ordered soldiers deployed in Seoul to handle rescue operations; they were also joined by soldiers from the United States Army. Helicopters from the U.S. Army evacuated at least 50 flood-stricken people from the suburbs of Seoul.

See also 

 Typhoon Mangkhut (2018)
 Typhoon Viola (1969)
 Typhoon Rita (1953)
 Typhoon Kent (1995)

References 

1964 Pacific typhoon season
Typhoons in Hong Kong
Typhoons in the Philippines
Typhoons in China
Typhoons in South Korea
Typhoons